Eusarcus is a genus of harvestmen found in northeastern Argentina, eastern Paraguay, Uruguay and from northeastern to southern Brazil. One of the oldest genera of the Pachylinae subfamily, the genus contains 34 valid species.

References 

Harvestman genera